Emmanuel Essiam (born 19 December 2003), is a Ghanaian footballer who currently plays as a midfielder for Swiss side Basel.

Club career
In January 2022, having represented Berekum Chelsea in the Ghana Premier League, Essiam moved to Switzerland to join Basel.    Shortly after joining, Essiam suffered an injury, keeping him out of first team action. He got over his injury and started training with Basel on October 7, 2022.

International career
Essiam represented the Ghanaian under-20 side at the 2021 Africa U-20 Cup of Nations, winning the competition. He also played in a friendly against the Japan under-23s.

Personal life
Emmanuel Essiam was born and raised in Ghana. On January 3, 2022 Basel discovered his talent and transferred with high hopes.

Career statistics

Club

Notes

Honours
Ghana U20
Africa U-20 Cup of Nations: 2021

References

External links

(Swiss Football League) Profile

2003 births
Living people
Ghanaian footballers
Ghana youth international footballers
Association football midfielders
Ghana Premier League players
Berekum Chelsea F.C. players
FC Basel players
Ghanaian expatriate footballers
Ghanaian expatriate sportspeople in Switzerland
Expatriate footballers in Switzerland
21st-century Ghanaian people